In professional wrestling, championships are competed for in pre-determined matches that arise as a result of storylines featuring a professional wrestling promotion's roster of wrestlers. As of 2020 the Mexican Lucha libre or professional wrestling promotion known as Consejo Mundial de Lucha Libre (Spanish for "World Wrestling Council"; CMLL) promotes 30 different championships; 12 championships designated as World Championships in various divisions, 8 championships on a national level and 8 championships on a regional level. The championships are divided into weight limits as well as gender specific and size-specific divisions. The professional wrestling championships are not won through legitimate athletic competition; they are instead won via scripted endings to a match or on occasion awarded to a wrestler because of a storyline.

A total of 34 wrestlers hold the 30 officially CMLL promoted championships. There are thirteen male singles championships spread out over various weight classes, four championships for tag teams, three for Trios (three-man teams), three for female competitors and three for Mini-Estrella and Micro-Estrella competitors. The oldest CMLL championship is the Mexican National Welterweight Championship, created on June 17, 1934, which is also the oldest championship in professional wrestling still active.

The titles branded as "World" level can or have been defended outside of Mexico, whereas the Mexican National championships are normally only defended in Mexico and only Mexican citizens are eligible to hold the championships, although occasional exceptions have been made. The regional championships are typically not promoted outside the area to which they belong, such as a specific Mexican state. The CMLL Arena Coliseo Tag Team Championship was normally defended only in Arena Coliseo until 2016 when it was defended in Japan. In the 20th century CMLL strictly enforced the weight divisions, but since around 2000 the rules have occasionally been ignored. One example of this was Mephisto holding the NWA World Welterweight Championship, a belt with a  upper limit, despite weighing . The Mexico City Boxing and Pro Wrestling Commission governs the Mexican National Championships but have granted CMLL control of the five championships listed. The Occidente ("Western") championships are endorsed by the Jalisco state boxing and wrestling commission and promoted by CMLL's Guadalajara branch.

World championships

CMLL-promoted secondary championships

CMLL Guadalajara championships

Co-promoted championships

No longer promoted / Inactive

National championships

Regional championships

Former championships

 LLA Azteca Championship
 Mexican National Mini-Estrella Championship
 NWA World Light Heavyweight Championship
 NWA World Middleweight Championship
 NWA World Welterweight Championship
 CMLL-Reina International Junior Championship
 CMLL-Reina International Championship

Footnotes

References

 
CMLL current